The 1986–87 Liga Artzit season saw Tzafririm Holon win the title and promotion to Liga Leumit.

As both Liga Leumit and Liga Artzit reduced to 14 clubs each, the bottom four clubs, Hapoel Beit She'an, Beitar Ramla, Beitar Nahariya and Hapoel Dimona were all relegated to Liga Alef. furthermore, promotion-relegation play-offs held between the 11th and 12th placed clubs in Liga Artzit, Hapoel Marmorek and Hapoel Ramat Gan and the winners of the regional divisions of Liga Alef. the play-offs ended with Hapoel Ramat Gan remained in Liga Artzit and Hapoel Marmorek relegated to Liga Alef.

Final table

Relegation play-offs
A promotion-relegation play-off between the 11th and 12th placed clubs in Liga Alef, Hapoel Marmorek and Hapoel Ramat Gan, and the winners of the regional divisions of Liga Alef, Maccabi Hadera and Hapoel Bat Yam. Each club played the other three once.

References
Previous seasons The Israel Football Association 
Hapoel Bat Yam promoted to Artzit, Hapoel Ramat Gan remained Maariv, 14.6.87, Historical Jewish Press 

Liga Artzit seasons
Israel
2